The 2010–11 Clemson Tigers men's basketball team represented Clemson University during the 2010–11 NCAA Division I men's basketball season. The Tigers, led by first-year head coach Brad Brownell, played their home games at Littlejohn Coliseum and were members of the Atlantic Coast Conference. They finished the season 22–12, 9–7 in ACC play. They lost in the semifinals of the 2011 ACC men's basketball tournament to North Carolina. They received an at-large bid to the 2011 NCAA Division I men's basketball tournament where they defeated UAB in the new First Four round before falling to West Virginia in the second round.

Roster

Schedule
 
|-
!colspan=9| Exhibition

|-
!colspan=9| Regular season

|-
!colspan=9| ACC tournament

|-
!colspan=9| NCAA tournament

References

Clemson
Clemson
Clemson Tigers men's basketball seasons